Parliamentary elections were held in Bolivia on 1 May 1949, electing half the seats of the Chamber of Deputies and one-third the seats in the Senate.

Results

References

Elections in Bolivia
Bolivia
Legislative election
Election and referendum articles with incomplete results